Datin Paduka Dr. Tan Yee Kew (born 1953) is a Malaysian politician who served as the Member of Parliament (MP) for Wangsa Maju from May 2018 to November 2022, for Klang from April 1995 to March 2008 and Parliamentary Secretary of International Trade and Industry from March 2004 to March 2008. She is a member of the People's Justice Party (PKR), a component party of the Pakatan Harapan (PH) opposition coalition and was a member of the Malaysian Chinese Association (MCA), a component party of the ruling Barisan Nasional (BN) coalition. She was also the Treasurer of PKR before 2018, Deputy Women Chief of MCA from 1996 to 2005, State Women Chief of MCA of Selangor and Member of the Central Committee of MCA.

Political career 
Tan joined MCA in 1986.

Tan was also the Director of the Port Klang Authority from 1998 to 2001, before she was appointed as the Parliamentary secretary of Ministry of International Trade and Industry in 2004.

Anyhow, Tan was censured on violating the party disciplines, and her party membership had been suspended for 6 months in 2005. Furthermore, she was dropped as the candidate of 2008 general election, where MCA and BN suffered a great loss in Selangor later. Tan quit herself from MCA on 17 July 2008 and joined PKR with more than thousand of followers.

Election results

Honours

Honours of Malaysia 
  :
  Knight Companion of the Order of Sultan Salahuddin Abdul Aziz Shah (DSSA) – Datin Paduka (2000)

References

External links 

 
 

1953 births
Living people
People from Selangor
People's Justice Party (Malaysia) politicians
Former Malaysian Chinese Association politicians
Malaysian politicians of Chinese descent
Members of the Dewan Rakyat
Women members of the Dewan Rakyat
University of Malaya alumni
University of the Punjab alumni
Alumni of the University of Reading
Alumni of the University of Wales